Żuki may refer to\;

Places in Poland
Żuki, Gmina Terespol in Biała Podlaska County, Lublin Voivodeship (east Poland)
Żuki, Gmina Tuczna in Biała Podlaska County, Lublin Voivodeship (east Poland)
Żuki, Gmina Tykocin in Białystok County, Podlaskie Voivodeship (north-east Poland)
Żuki, Gmina Zabłudów in Białystok County, Podlaskie Voivodeship (north-east Poland)
Żuki, Gmina Kleszczele in Hajnówka County, Podlaskie Voivodeship (north-east Poland)
Żuki, Gmina Sokółka in Sokółka County, Podlaskie Voivodeship (north-east Poland)
Żuki, Masovian Voivodeship (east-central Poland)
Żuki, Greater Poland Voivodeship (west-central Poland)

People
Mohd Zuki Ali (born 1962), 15th Chief Secretary to the Government of Malaysia
Zuki Lee (born 1977), Hong Kong actress
Sho Tsukioka, nicknamed "Zuki", a character in the Japanese novel Battle Royale

See also
Tsuki, term for thrusting techniques in Japanese martial arts, often spelled zuki in compound words